Benjamin "Ben" M. Rosen (born March 11, 1933) is the former chairman and former acting chief executive officer of Compaq
 and a co-founder of Sevin Rosen Funds.

Early life
Rosen was born to a Jewish family in New Orleans, Louisiana, on March 11, 1933, to Isadore and Anna Rosen.  Rosen's father was a dentist and his mother was a secretary. "Benji" as he was called, was the youngest of his parents' three children.

He received a B.S. from the California Institute of Technology in 1954, and M.S. from Stanford University in 1955, and an M.B.A. from Columbia Business School in 1961.

Career
He worked on Wall Street for 15 years, ending his career as a Senior Technology Analyst and Vice President at Morgan Stanley.

Sevin Rosen Funds
Rosen co-founded the venture capital company Sevin Rosen Funds in 1981 with L. J. Sevin.  In this capacity, Rosen invested in Compaq Computer Corporation in 1981, eventually serving as Chairman for 18 years.  For four months in 1999, Rosen also served as Acting CEO. As a financier, Rosen backed high tech startup companies including Electronic Arts, Lotus Development, Ansa Software and Silicon Graphics.

In 1985, at age 52, he was described as "a late bloomer who has had five careers" and "chairman and general partner" of the fund.

Rosen Electronic Letter
Rosen Electronic Letter was distributed via a separate entity named Rosen Research. In 1982, Esther Dyson began working there and, in 1983 she bought the company from her employer, renaming the company EDventure Holdings and the Rosen Electronic Letter newsletter Release 1.0.

Awards
In 1999, Rosen was awarded the Founders Medal of the Institute of Electrical and Electronics Engineers (IEEE). He was named a recipient of Caltech Distinguished Alumni Award in 2007. In 2018, he received Caltech's highest honor, the Robert A. Millikan Medal.

Family
He and his first wife Alexandra are the parents of their two sons, Jeffrey Rosen and Eric Rosen. He is married to Donna Perrett Rosen and also has a step-daughter, Melanie Perret.

References

1933 births
Living people
California Institute of Technology alumni
Columbia Business School alumni
Businesspeople from New Orleans
Stanford University alumni
American company founders
20th-century American Jews
American technology chief executives
21st-century American Jews